Rebecca Margot Godfrey (December 2, 1967 – October 3, 2022) was a Canadian novelist and non-fiction writer.

Life and career
Godfrey was born in Toronto, Ontario, to writers Dave Godfrey and Ellen Godfrey. As a child she relocated with her family to Victoria, British Columbia. Godfrey attended the University of Toronto and Sarah Lawrence College, from which she received a MFA in Creative Writing. She worked in Toronto and New York as a journalist and editor before she began writing books.

Godfrey's first book, The Torn Skirt (2001), a novel, was shortlisted for the 2002 Ethel Wilson Fiction Prize. Described as an antidote to the sad boy lit of David Foster Wallace, it received a favorable review in the New York Times.

Godfrey's second book, Under the Bridge (2005), an investigation into the beating death of Reena Virk, received British Columbia's National Award for Canadian Non-Fiction in 2006.  The book was optioned for film adaptation by Reese Witherspoon's Type A Productions, but the project has not come to fruition. In 2017 Godfrey wrote a follow up to her book with an update on the legal fate of the two convicted killers and the lives of the girls involved in the crime for Vice Magazine. The book was also included in Rolling Stone's 2017 list of 11 True Crime books for Music lovers and Men's Journal's list of the 10 Best True Crime Books. On June 25, 2019, Gallery Books published a new edition of Under the Bridge with an introduction by Godfrey's friend Mary Gaitskill.

Godfrey subsequently continued to write portraits of unconventional, yet influential women, most recently interviewing Robyn Doolittle on her 2014 expose of Toronto Mayor Rob Ford's tumultuous political career and interviewing German actress Barbara Sukowa on the legacy of Hannah Arendt.

In August 2016 Godfrey curated an acclaimed gallery show at the Instar Lodge in Germantown, New York, titled  Girls in Trees.  Featuring works by over 33 artists and writers, including the photographer Brigitte Lacombe, the Pulitzer Prize-winning poet Sharon Olds, the novelists Mary Gaitskill and Samantha Hunt, poet Nick Flynn, painter Lisa Sanditz, sculptors Julianne Swartz and Diann Bauer. The accompanying publication includes photographs, text, and other artistic materials offering a variety of perspectives on the theme of girlhood and nature.

In 2016, Godfrey was awarded a Fellowship from the MacDowell Colony, where she worked on her novel The Dilettante. The novel explores the early life of Peggy Guggenheim, her first gallery, and a brief, unlikely affair with Samuel Beckett. Prior to this, Godfrey was a Visiting Artist at The American Academy of Rome.

Godfrey was an adjunct assistant professor of creative writing at Columbia University,  where she taught fiction workshops and a seminar on Anti-Heroines in literature.  Former students who went on to publish works influenced by the themes of the seminar include Mandy Berman, Naima Coster and Maddox Pennington.

Godfrey died from lung cancer in New York City, on October 3, 2022, at the age of 54.

At her death, Godfrey had nearly completed her novel about Peggy Guggenheim. The novel, which will be completed using her notes, is scheduled to be published posthumously by Knopf in the summer of 2023. 

A week before her death, Hulu announced it had ordered an eight-episode true-crime limited series, Under the Bridge, based on Godfrey's book of the same name. Credited as one of the executive producers, Godfrey collaborated with Quinn Shepard for two and a half years to adapt the book for the screen. Production began in December 2022.

In popular media 
The Torn Skirt established a cult following with fans including Thurston Moore, Mary Gaitskill and made an appearance on Season 3 of Gossip Girl.
 Under the Bridge received a mention in a 2006 interview with Peter Dinklage.
 In an interview with Laura Lippman, the novelist Megan Abbott, show runner and writer of the Netflix series Dare Me, cites Under the Bridge as inspiration and part of a movement of contemporary "dark female fiction."

Bibliography

References

External links
 Author site
 HarperCollins Canada site
 http://www.pen.org/viewmedia.php/prmMID/114/prmID/521
 https://www.nytimes.com/2002/11/03/books/rude-awakenings.html?sec=&spon=&pagewanted=all
 http://arts.columbia.edu/writing/faculty/adjunct/rebecca-godfrey
 https://www.publishersmarketplace.com/login.php/dealmakers/detail.cgi%3Fid%3D2398

1967 births
2022 deaths
Canadian non-fiction writers
Canadian women non-fiction writers
Canadian women novelists
Sarah Lawrence College alumni
Writers from Toronto
21st-century Canadian novelists
21st-century Canadian women writers
Deaths from lung cancer in New York (state)
University of Toronto alumni